Magic is a 2013 Indonesian soap opera that airs on RCTI daily. Produced by SinemArt Production, it stars Giorgino Abraham, Aurellie Moeremans, Putri Titian, Bobby Joseph and Joshua Suherman and airs at 18:00-19:00 WIB, 19:00-20:00 WITA, and 20:00-21:00 WIT.

Cast 

 Giorgino Abraham as Aditya
 Aurellie Moremans as Kimmy
 Putri Titian as Adelia
 Bobby Joseph as Andra
 Joshua Suherman as Reza
 Jordi Onsu as Brocky
 Nasya Marcella as Nadine
 Cut Meyriska as Citra
 Jihan Fahira as Kartika
 Tengku Ryan as Johan.
 Dion Chow as Mr. Julian.
 Jonathan Andriano as Chris
 Arrozi Mahally as Jamal
 Reymon Knuliqh as Kosim
 Munajat Raditya as Oding
 Erlin Sarinton as Wiwid
 Fachri Muhammad as Fachri
 Lucky Perdana as Aris
 Luna Shabrina as Luna
 Ochi Rosdiana as Liana
 Adipura Prabahaswara as Reyhaan
 Umar Lubis as Gito
 Teddy Syah as Topan

International broadcasts

External links 
 Sinemart

 Indonesian television soap operas